Đulići may refer to:
 Đulići (Zvornik), Bosnia and Herzegovina
 Đulići, Montenegro
 Đulići, a poetry collection by Jovan Jovanović Zmaj